Hakim Muhammad Hassan Qarshi (December 27, 1896 – December 6, 1974) was a practitioner of Unani medicine, author, and the founder of Qarshi Dawakhana. He was a student of Hakim Ajmal Khan and the family physician of Muhammad Iqbal from 1934 to 1938.

Life and career
Qarshi was born on December 27, 1896, in Gujrat, Punjab, British India. He received his primary education in his hometown. He enrolled in Islamia College Lahore for further education, but was expelled from the college for participating in national movements. Then he entered Hakeem Ajmal Khan's Unani Tibbia College, Delhi. He had a special interest in medical knowledge. Noticing his passion for medical education, Hakim Ajmal Khan gave him the title of "Qarshi". He was entrusted with the responsibilities of the principal of the medical college, founded by Hakim Ajmal Khan in Mumbai.  Qarshi struggled throughout his life to give Unani Tib its rightful place in society.

Qarshi was a close friend and physician of Muhammad Iqbal during his last years. Earlier, upon the suggestion of Iqbal, he had founded the "Matab Qarshi" in 1920 in Lahore.

Qarshi remained an active member of Tibb Research Committee, Hyderabad and the Tibb Research Committee, Punjab from 1920 to 1946 in British India.

Qarshi also was an active member of Khilafat Movement and held the position of Vice President of his local Khilafat Committee in Lahore. He coordinated his efforts towards this, as a loyal team member, with the national leaders of this movement like Mohammad Ali Jauhar, Maulana Shaukat Ali and Maulana Zafar Ali Khan.

Personal life
Qarshi married Bilqees Begum in 1922. Both had 4 sons and 3 daughters.

Death
Qarshi passed away on December 6, 1974, at the age of 78.

Books
 Bayaz-e-Maseeha
 Dastoor-ul-Atibba.
 Jame-ul-Hikmat
 Jame-ul-Hikmat
 Jinsi Amraz Ka Ilaj (Silk-e-Murwareed)
 Kitab-ul-Kulliyat.
 Mukhtasar-ul-Kulliyat

Awards and honors
 On 20 December 2002, the Pakistan Post issued a commemorative postage stamp in the memory of Hakeem Muhammad Hassan Qureshi on the occasion of his 100th birthday.

See also
Hakim Muhammad Sharif Khan (1722 - 1807)
Hakim Ajmal Khan (1868 - 1927)
Hakeem Muhammad Saeed (1920 - 1998)
Hakeem Rizwan Hafeez Malik

References

External links

1896 births
1974 deaths
Herbalists
Pakistani medical researchers
Pakistani medical writers
Pakistani pharmacists
Pakistani pharmacologists
Pakistan Movement activists